Charles Cassal (1 April 1818 - 11 March 1885) was a deputy of the Second French Republic and professor of French at University College London. He was a Chevalier of the Légion d'honneur. His granddaughter, Mrs Dorothy Beatrice Staunton, established the Cassal Endowment Fund in memory of her grandfather and her father Celestin Cassal.

References 

1818 births
1885 deaths
Academics of University College London
Chevaliers of the Légion d'honneur
French politicians